Shaji Antony (born 19 April 1991) is an Indian professional footballer who plays as a defender for I-League club Chennai City.

Club career
Born in Kerala, Antony was part of the first-team squad for I-League club Chennai City for the 2017–18 season. He made his professional debut for the club on 9 January 2018 against NEROCA, coming on as a late second half stoppage-time substitute for Murilo.

After not appearing in the Chennai City squad for two seasons, Antony was named as part of the club's first-team squad for the 2020–21 season. His first appearance that season was against 9 February 2021 against NEROCA. He started but only played 22 minutes before being substituted in a 2–1 victory.

Career statistics

References

External links
 Profile at the All India Football Federation

1991 births
Living people
Sportspeople from Kerala
Indian footballers
Association football defenders
Chennai City FC players
I-League players
Footballers from Kerala